The Primera D is one of two leagues that form the fifth division of the Argentine football league system. Made up of 11 clubs from Buenos Aires Province, the league is the only one that remains amateur. The other league at level five is the Torneo Federal C, where teams from regional leagues take part.

It was created in 1950 under the name "Tercera de Ascenso" ("third level of promotion"). The first champion was Liniers. In 1962 the tournament changed its name to "Primera de Aficionados", which lasted to 1974, when it was called "Primera D", which has remained to date.

Since the restructuring of the league system in 1986, the division became the fifth category of Argentine football (lower than Primera División, Primera B Nacional, Primera B Metropolitana and Primera C).

In 2023 its last edition will be held because from 2024, the category will be unified with the Primera C in a single tournament.

Format 
The winners of Primera D gain automatic promotion to Primera C. The club finishing in 2nd to 9th place behind enter a playoff series; the winner of which faces the club finishing second bottom in Primera C in a promotion/relegation playoff.

The team that finishes bottom of Primera D Metropolitana faces relegation. However, because Primera D Metropolitana is the lowest league in the Argentine football system relegation this means that the relegated team will not participate in the league system the following season.

Current teams (2022 season)

List of Champions

Titles by club

Notes

References

External links
 

 
1950 establishments in Argentina
3
5
Sports leagues established in 1950